On November 3, 2020, the District of Columbia held an election for its non-voting House delegate representing the District of Columbia's at-large congressional district. The election coincided with the elections of other federal, state, and local offices.

The non-voting delegate is elected for a two-year term. Democrat Eleanor Holmes Norton, who has represented the district since 1991, was successfully re-elected to a sixteenth term in office.

General election

Candidates
 John "Recovery" Cheeks (independent), candidate for Delegate in 2018
 Barbara Washington Franklin (independent), attorney
 Patrick Hynes (Libertarian), D.C. campaign director for 2020 presidential candidate Jo Jorgensen
 David Krucoff (independent), District of Columbia retrocession activist
 Amir Lowery (independent), former Major League Soccer player
 Omari Musa (Socialist Workers), nominee for Mayor of the District of Columbia in 2010
 Eleanor Holmes Norton (Democratic), incumbent Delegate
 Natale Lino Stracuzzi (D.C. Statehood Green), nominee for Delegate in 2012, in 2014, in 2016, and in 2018

Results

See also
 United States House of Representatives elections in the District of Columbia

References

District of Columbia
2020
United States House of Representatives